Dawid Olejniczak (born March 1, 1983, in Łódź) is a Polish tennis player.

Olejniczak has a career-high ATP singles ranking of World No. 185, achieved on 11 August 2008. He also has a career-high ATP doubles ranking of World No. 206, achieved on 17 July 2006.

2008 
In June, Olejniczak qualified in singles for the 2008 Wimbledon Championships after defeating World No. 184 Lukáš Rosol, No. 158 Aisam Qureshi, and Rik de Voest respectively in the three qualifying rounds.

ATP Challenger and ITF Futures finals

Singles: 15 (8–7)

Doubles: 26 (17–9)

References

External links
 
 
 Olejniczak Recent Match Results
 Olejniczak World Ranking History

1983 births
Polish male tennis players
Living people
Sportspeople from Łódź